Partial general elections were held in Luxembourg on 6 June 1937, electing 26 of the 55 seats in the Chamber of Deputies in the centre and north of the country. The Party of the Right won 13 of the 26 seats and remained the largest party with 25 of the 55 seats.

Results

References

Chamber of Deputies (Luxembourg) elections
Legislative election, 1937
Luxembourg
1937 in Luxembourg
June 1937 events
Election and referendum articles with incomplete results